The Glass's shrew (Crocidura glassi) is a species of mammal in the family Soricidae. It is endemic to Ethiopia. The mammal's natural habitats are subtropical or tropical high-elevation shrubland and grassland, and swamps.

Sources

Crocidura
Endemic fauna of Ethiopia
Mammals of Ethiopia
Fauna of the Ethiopian Highlands
Vulnerable animals
Vulnerable biota of Africa
Mammals described in 1966
Ethiopian montane moorlands
Taxonomy articles created by Polbot
Taxa named by Henri Heim de Balsac